Universidade Franciscana is a private university center in Santa Maria, Rio Grande do Sul, Brazil. The center was founded in 1955 and today it offers over thirty undergraduate courses.

See also
Paleorrota Geopark

External links
Centro Universitário Franciscano
Curso de Ciência da Computação e Sistemas de Informação

Universities and colleges in Rio Grande do Sul
Santa Maria, Rio Grande do Sul
Educational institutions established in 1955
1955 establishments in Brazil
Private universities and colleges in Brazil